Mattapoisett Center is a census-designated place (CDP) in the town of Mattapoisett in Plymouth County, Massachusetts, United States. The population was 2,915 at the 2010 census.

Geography
Mattapoisett Center is located at  (41.660688, -70.802310).

Demographics

At the 2000 census, there were 2,966 people, 1,283 households and 822 families residing in the CDP. The racial makeup of the CDP was 96.12% White, 0.98% African American, 0.07% Native American, 0.91% Asian, 1.21% from other races, and 0.71% from two or more races. Hispanic or Latino of any race were 0.78% of the population.

There were 1,283 households, of which 27.3% had children under the age of 18 living with them, 50.0% were married couples living together, 10.8% had a female householder with no husband present, and 35.9% were non-families. 31.0% of all households were made up of individuals, and 16.0% had someone living alone who was 65 years of age or older. The average household size was 2.29 and the average family size was 2.87.

22.5% of the population were under the age of 18, 4.2% from 18 to 24, 25.8% from 25 to 44, 28.3% from 45 to 64, and 19.3% who were 65 years of age or older. The median age was 44 years. For every 100 females, there were 87.1 males. For every 100 females age 18 and over, there were 82.4 males.

The median household income was $54,107 and the median family income was $65,893. Males had a median income of $51,477 versus $35,950 for females. The per capita income for the CDP was $28,758. About 3.6% of families and 5.3% of the population were below the poverty line, including 4.3% of those under age 18 and 4.7% of those age 65 or over.

References

Census-designated places in Plymouth County, Massachusetts
Census-designated places in Massachusetts